Asian Myrmecology is a peer-reviewed open access scholarly journal publishing research on Asian myrmecology (ants). It is published by Universiti Malaysia Sabah Press and an official journal of the International Network for Myrmecology in Asia (ANeT). The current editor-in-chief is Adam L. Cronin.

In 2017, the journal won a Current Research in Malaysia (CREAM) award in recognition of commitment to quality, from the Malaysian Ministry of Higher Education. In 2018, a paper in this journal won the 'Best Journal Paper' award at the annual Malaysian Scholarly Publishing Council (MAPIM) awards.

Abstracting and indexing 
The journal is abstracted and indexed in:

References

External links 
 

Publications established in 2007
English-language journals
Entomology journals and magazines
Myrmecology